Cesar Chavez Day is a U.S. federal commemorative holiday, proclaimed by President Barack Obama in 2014. The holiday celebrates the birth and legacy of the civil rights and labor movement activist Cesar Chavez on March 31 every year.

Observances by state

Origins

Cesar Chavez (born Cesar Estrada Chavez, ; March 31, 1927April 23, 1993) was an American farm worker, labor leader and civil rights activist, who, with Dolores Huerta, co-founded the National Farm Workers Association (later the United Farm Workers union, UFW).

It is commemorated to promote service to the community in honor of Cesar Chavez's life and work. Some state government offices, community colleges, libraries, and public schools are closed. Texas also recognizes the day, and it is an optional holiday in Arizona (official holiday in the city of Phoenix, Arizona) and Colorado. Americans are urged to "observe this day with appropriate service, community, and educational programs to honor Cesar Chavez's enduring legacy." In addition, there are celebrations in his honor in Arizona, Michigan, Nebraska, and New Mexico and has been observed in California since 1995, in Texas since 2000 and in Colorado since 2003 as state holidays (optional in Texas and Colorado).

History

Proclamations
On March 31, 2008, while a senator, Barack Obama endorsed the idea of creating a national holiday in Chavez's honor: "Chavez left a legacy as an educator, environmentalist, and a civil rights leader. And his cause lives on. As farm workers and laborers across America continue to struggle for fair treatment and fair wages, we find strength in what Cesar Chavez accomplished so many years ago. And we should honor him for what he's taught us about making America a stronger, more just, and more prosperous nation. That's why I support the call to make Cesar Chavez's birthday a national holiday. It's time to recognize the contributions of this American icon to the ongoing efforts to perfect our union." Grassroots organizations continued to urge creation of such a national holiday; and, on March 30, 2011, Obama as president reiterated his support: "Cesar Chavez's legacy provides lessons from which all Americans can learn."

Cesar Chavez Day has been celebrated in Reno, Nevada, since 2003. A state law passed in 2009 (AB 301) requires Nevada's governor to annually issue a proclamation declaring March 31 as Cesar Chavez Day.

On March 28, 2014, President Obama used his authority to proclaim each March 31 as Cesar Chavez Day.

National holiday movement

Cesar Chavez Day as a national holiday has gained support from musician Carlos Santana, civil rights and labor leaders. Rallies were held in 2006 in Los Angeles with the goal of raising awareness beyond California.  Currently, a major obstacle to this day becoming a national holiday is caused by a rule in Congress that prevents bills with national holiday provisions from being introduced.  The holiday proposal would need to overcome that obstacle before legislation can be introduced.

Reception
The day highlights the legacy of Cesar Chavez, and focuses on Chicano or Mexican Americans efforts in the labor movement. Events surrounding the holiday largely ignore the actions of the Agricultural Workers Organizing Committee, and its Filipino American membership and leadership, who began the Delano grape strike which propelled Cesar Chavez to international notoriety. Due to this Filipino Americans have been critical of the day's focus, which excludes acknowledgement of their history.

See also
 Public holidays in the United States

References

External links
A Model curriculum for teaching Cesar Chavez's legacy

March observances
Observances in the United States by presidential proclamation
United Farm Workers
State holidays in the United States
Cesar Chavez
Birthdays